Marek Szyndrowski (born 30 October 1980 in Świętochłowice) is a Polish retired footballer who played as a defender.

Career

Club
Previously he played for Arka Gdynia, Ruch Chorzów and Korona Kielce.

In late 2010, he signed for Ruch Chorzów.

References

External links
 

1980 births
Living people
Polish footballers
Association football defenders
Ruch Chorzów players
Korona Kielce players
Arka Gdynia players
GKS Bełchatów players
Polonia Bytom players
Ekstraklasa players
I liga players
II liga players
People from Świętochłowice
Sportspeople from Silesian Voivodeship